Louis Le Breton (1818 in Douarnenez – 1866) was a French painter who specialised in marine paintings.

Le Breton studied medicine and took part in Dumont d'Urville's second voyage aboard the Astrolabe. After the official illustrator of the expedition died, Le Breton replaced him.

From 1847 he devoted himself mainly to depicting marine subjects for the French Navy.

Occult
Louis Le Breton executed 69 illustrations of occult demons, working from engravings by M. Jarrault, for the 1863 edition of Dictionnaire Infernal by Collin de Plancy.

See also
 European and American voyages of scientific exploration

References

External links
Adorning the world: art of the Marquesas Islands, an exhibition catalog from The Metropolitan Museum of Art (fully available online as PDF), which contains material on Louis Le Breton (no. 27)

1818 births
1866 deaths
19th-century French painters
French male painters
19th-century French male artists